Jalan Kempas Lama (Johor state road J193) is a major road in Johor Bahru District, Johor, Malaysia.

List of junctions

Roads in Johor